Fiammetta Rossi (born 2 June 1995) is an Italian shooter who won two medals at the 2019 Summer Universiade.

Biography
She is the daughter of the President of the Federazione Italiana Tiro a Volo (Italian Shooting Federation) Luciano Rossi.

See also
 Italy at the 2019 Summer Universiade

References

External links
 
 Fiammetta Rossi

1995 births
Living people
Italian female sport shooters
Universiade medalists in shooting
Universiade gold medalists for Italy
Universiade silver medalists for Italy
Medalists at the 2019 Summer Universiade
Shooters of Fiamme Oro